Giles Blunt (born 1952) is a Canadian novelist, poet, and screenwriter. His first novel, Cold Eye, was a psychological thriller set in the New York art world, which was made into the French movie Les Couleurs du diable (Allain Jessua, 1997).

Career
Blunt is also the author of the John Cardinal novels, set in the small city of Algonquin Bay, in Northern Ontario.  Blunt was born in Windsor, Ontario, and grew up in North Bay; Algonquin Bay is North Bay thinly disguised — for example, Blunt retains the names of major streets and the two lakes (Trout Lake and Lake Nipissing) that the town sits between, the physical layout of the two places is the same, and he describes Algonquin Bay as being in the same geographical location as North Bay.

The first Cardinal story, Forty Words for Sorrow, won the British Crime Writers' Association Silver Dagger, and the second, The Delicate Storm, won the Crime Writers of Canada's Arthur Ellis Award for best novel, as did the sixth, "Until the Night." The 2010 John Cardinal novel Crime Machine was described as "a richly plotted work by one of Canada's best mystery novelists."

Blunt also has written No Such Creature, a "road novel" set in the American southwest, and Breaking Lorca, which is set in a clandestine jail in El Salvador in the 1980s. Twice nominated for the Dublin IMPAC award, his novels have been compared to the work of Ian Rankin and Cormac McCarthy.

Blunt's television credits include episodes of Law & Order, Street Legal, and Night Heat plus four series of Cardinal, a series adapted from his novels.

Blunt received the honorary degree of Doctor of Education on June 12, 2014, from Nipissing University.

Bibliography

John Cardinal series

 2000 Forty Words for Sorrow Random  House Canada 
 2002 The Delicate Storm Random  House Canada 
 2005 Black Fly Season Random  House Canada 
 2006 By the Time You Read This (also published as The Fields of Grief) Random House Canada 
 2010 Crime Machine Random House Canada 
 2012 Until the Night Random House Canada

Other books

 1989 Cold Eye Avon Books, US & Canada (paperback) 
 2008 No Such Creature Random House Canada 
 2009 Breaking Lorca Random House Canada 
 2015 The Hesitation Cut Random House Canada 
 2016 Vanishing Act Exile Editions  (poems)

Screenwriting credits

Other

References

External links
 

 
 Online interview from CBC's Words at Large
 

1952 births
Living people
Canadian mystery writers
Canadian male novelists
People from North Bay, Ontario
Writers from Windsor, Ontario
Canadian male screenwriters
20th-century Canadian novelists
21st-century Canadian novelists
20th-century Canadian male writers
21st-century Canadian male writers
20th-century Canadian screenwriters
21st-century Canadian screenwriters